Client Liaison are an Australian indie pop duo made up of vocalist Monte Morgan, and keyboardist and producer Harvey Miller. The pair first came to prominence in 2012 after the release of their first music video "End of the Earth", and went on to release a self-titled EP in 2014, and studio album Diplomatic Immunity in 2016. Their second studio album, Divine Intervention was released on 1 October 2021.

Background

Origins 
Client Liaison was formed in Melbourne in 2009 by former Geelong Grammar schoolmates Monte Morgan (born 1985) and Harvey Miller (born 22 May 1988).

Influenced by late '80s and early '90s electronic and house music, the pair produces a style of music described by them as "faux-fi", and incorporate a similar 1980s Australia theme into their personas. As part of this image, the pair draw a wide range of Australian references into their performances and music videos, and often make reference to brands such Ansett, Foster's, and Diners Club, and have named Tina Arena and John Farnham as being amongst the many influences on their music.

When performing live, the duo expands to include Miller's brother Geordie Miller on guitar and saxophone, and Triple J's Hack presenter Tom Tilley, whom Miller had met through a previous girlfriend, on bass.

Both Monte and Harvey attended the private Geelong Grammar School. The former is the son of executive-chairman of Roy Morgan Research, Gary Morgan, the latter is the son of director George T. Miller. The duo bases themselves in a Collins Street office space owned by Morgan's father's company. 

Morgan studied general arts at the University of Melbourne. Miller, who studied fine arts at the Victorian College of the Arts, frequently uses the postnominal AO after his name, describing himself as a "self-appointed" member of the Order of Australia — he is not, in reality, a member.

2012–2016: Client Liaison 
In mid-2012, Client Liaison released the music video for "End of the Earth", a song Morgan had written five years prior during a time when he was "angry with Australia" and its culture cringe. The video, featuring the pair in '80s pop clothing performing in front of a montage of iconic Australian clips, became a cult hit on YouTube.

It was not until over a year later, on 29 August 2014, that the duo released their first EP, eponymously titled Client Liaison. The music video for the single "Queen" was filmed on a VHS camcorder and made reference to the clip for the Womack and Womack song "Teardrops".

The pair played their first national tour as a support act for Miami Horror, and later went on to support Flight Facilities on their national and international tours.

At the 2014 J Awards, the duo were nominated for best music video for their song "Free of Fear" but lost to "Chandelier" by Sia.

2016–2017: Diplomatic Immunity 

Client Liaison's first studio album Diplomatic Immunity was released on 4 November 2016. The pair described the theme of the album as being of them as "diplomats flying the Australian flag, taking Australia to the world". The duo collaborated with Cleopold, Flight Facilities and Tina Arena while producing the album. The music video for "Wild Life", the album's second single, makes references to Qintex, the former company run by businessman-turned-fugitive Christopher Skase. The album's fourth single, "A Foreign Affair", features Tina Arena and makes reference to her 1995 song Sorrento Moon. As part of the release of the album, Client Liaison announced that in place of ordinary band merchandise they would be releasing a line of clothing named the "Client Liaison: Deluxe Line" with the assistance of stylist Kirsty Barros.

The pair performed at Firefly Music Festival, Splendour in the Grass, and Secret Garden Festival in 2015, Groovin' the Moo and The Falls Music and Arts Festival in 2016, and Field Day in 2017. The band commenced a world tour titled "A Foreign Affair" in August 2017. In November, the group won Australian Music Video of the Year at the 2017 J Awards for "A Foreign Affair", which was directed by Tim White.

2018–present: Divine Intervention 

In May 2018, Client Liaison released "Survival in the City".

In August 2019, Client Liaison released "The Real Thing", and confirmed they are working on a second studio album. In November 2019, Client Liaison released "Champagne Affection". In June 2021, Client Liaison announced the released of their second studio album Divine Intervention, released on 1 October 2021.

Divine Intervention became the band's first ARIA top ten albums, debuting at number 7.

Discography

Albums

EPs

Singles

As lead artist

Remixes
 "Cruel", The Preatures (June 2015)
 "90s Music", Kimbra (August 2014)
 "Rain", Retiree (February 2014)
 "Oh Innocence", Dúné (March 2013)

Awards and nominations

AIR Awards
The Australian Independent Record Awards (commonly known informally as AIR Awards) is an annual awards night to recognise, promote and celebrate the success of Australia's Independent Music sector.

! 
|-
| 2015
| Client Liaison
| Breakthrough Independent Artist
| 
|
|-

ARIA Music Awards
The ARIA Music Awards is an annual awards ceremony that recognises excellence, innovation, and achievement across all genres of Australian music. They commenced in 1987. 

! 
|-
|rowspan="2" |  2017
| Tim White (for Client Liaison featuring Tina Arena) - "A Foreign Affair"
|rowspan="3" |  Best Video
| 
|rowspan="3" |   
|-
| Tobias Willis and Zachary Bradtke for Client Liaison - "Off White Limousine"
| 
|-
| 2018
| David Porte Beckefeld (for Client Liaison) - ""Survival in the City"]"
|  
|-

J Award
The J Awards are an annual series of Australian music awards that were established by the Australian Broadcasting Corporation's youth-focused radio station Triple J. They commenced in 2005.

|-
| J Awards of 2014
|"Free of Fear"
| Australian Video of the Year
| 
|-
| J Awards of 2017
| "A Foreign Affair" (with Tina Arena)
| Australian Video of the Year
| 
|-

Music Victoria Awards
The Music Victoria Awards, are an annual awards night celebrating Victorian music. They commenced in 2005.

|-
| 2013
| Best Electronic Act
| rowspan="7" | Music Victoria Awards
| 
|-
| rowspan="3"| 2014
| Best Electronic Act
| 
|-
| Best Emerging Artist 
| 
|-
| Best Band
| 
|-
| 2016
| Best Electronic Act
| 
|-
| 2017
| Best Electronic Act
| 
|-

National Live Music Awards
The National Live Music Awards (NLMAs) are a broad recognition of Australia's diverse live industry, celebrating the success of the Australian live scene. The awards commenced in 2016.

|-
| National Live Music Awards of 2016
| Tom Tilley (Client Liaison)
| Live Bassist of the Year
| 
|-
| rowspan="4" | National Live Music Awards of 2017
| rowspan="3" | themselves
| Live Act of the Year
| 
|-
| Live Pop Act of the Year
| 
|-
| People's Choice - Live Act of the Year
| 
|-
| Tom Tilley (Client Liaison)
| Live Bassist of the Year
| 
|-

References

External links
 Official website

Australian indie pop groups
Victoria (Australia) musical groups
Australian electronic musicians
Musical groups established in 2009